The canton of Revigny-sur-Ornain is an administrative division of the Meuse department, northeastern France. Its borders were modified at the French canton reorganisation which came into effect in March 2015. Its seat is in Revigny-sur-Ornain.

It consists of the following communes:
 
Andernay
Beurey-sur-Saulx
Brabant-le-Roi
Chaumont-sur-Aire
Contrisson
Courcelles-sur-Aire
Couvonges
Érize-la-Petite
Les Hauts-de-Chée
Laheycourt
Laimont
Lisle-en-Barrois
Louppy-le-Château
Mognéville
Nettancourt
Neuville-sur-Ornain
Noyers-Auzécourt
Rancourt-sur-Ornain
Rembercourt-Sommaisne
Remennecourt
Revigny-sur-Ornain
Robert-Espagne
Sommeilles
Val-d'Ornain
Vassincourt
Vaubecourt
Villers-aux-Vents
Villotte-devant-Louppy

References

Cantons of Meuse (department)